Masterminds was a true crime documentary television series produced in Canada with truTV (formerly Court TV). Each 30 minute episode features one true property crime story. The profiled property crimes generally involve large sums of cash or merchandise and, more important, extremely unusual and/or elaborate methods of criminal operation which were never before (and sometimes never since) seen by law enforcement agencies. With a few notable exceptions, most criminals profiled in this series were caught within a couple of years of committing their crime(s).

Episodes

Broadcast
, the program is broadcast on History Television and Global TV in Canada, and on truTV in the United States.

External links
Masterminds schedule at History Television 
Masterminds on OVGuide

2000s Canadian crime television series
2003 Canadian television series debuts
2007 Canadian television series endings
2000s Canadian documentary television series
TruTV original programming
Television series by Corus Entertainment
Television series by New Line Television
True crime television series